Andrew Flavel (born 30 December 1971) is an Australian wheelchair basketball player. He was born in Ballarat, Victoria.   He was part of the silver medal-winning Australia men's national wheelchair basketball team at the 2004 Athens Paralympics. He also participated in National Wheelchair Basketball League and represented Dandenong Rangers twice, first in 2002 and second in 2004 but in 2007 he played for Wollongong Rollerhawks in the league.

References

Paralympic silver medalists for Australia
Wheelchair category Paralympic competitors
Wheelchair basketball players at the 2004 Summer Paralympics
Paralympic wheelchair basketball players of Australia
Living people
Medalists at the 2004 Summer Paralympics
1971 births
Paralympic medalists in wheelchair basketball